Crime and Justice is an annual series of peer-reviewed commissioned essays on crime-related research subjects published by The University of Chicago Press. The journal was established in 1979. According to its self-description, it "explores a full range of issues concerning crime, its causes, and its cure", offering "an interdisciplinary approach to address core issues in criminology, with perspectives from biology, law, psychology, ethics, history, and sociology".

External links
Crime and Justice: A Review of Research 
University of Chicago Press academic journals
Criminology journals
American law journals
Annual journals
Publications established in 1979
English-language journals